The serape or jorongo is a long blanket-like shawl/cloak, often brightly colored and fringed at the ends, worn in Mexico, especially by men. The spelling of the word sarape (or zarape) is the accepted form in Mexico and in other Spanish-speaking countries. The term serape is for the rectangular woven blanket (no openings), though in more recent years it can also be used to refer to a very soft rectangular blanket with an opening in the middle for one's head, similar to a poncho called gabán, or jorongo in Mexico. Modern variations of some serapes are made with matching hoods for head covering. The length varies, but front and back normally reach knee height on an average person.

Available in various colors and design patterns, the typical colors of serapes from the highland regions are two-tone combinations of black, grey, brown, or tan depending on the natural color of the sheep flocks grown in the area, with large design patterns utilizing traditional indigenous motifs. On the other hand, the traditional serape as made in the Mexican state of Coahuila in north-eastern Mexico near the city of Saltillo often consists of a dark base color with bands of yellow, orange, red, blue, green, purple, or other bright colors. The ends are usually fringed.

History
The serape is thought to have its forebears in garments worn in the region near Chiautempan and Contla, Tlaxcala. During the Colonial period, it was taken to northern New Spain where it was adapted to the climate and the motifs changed. The city of Teocaltiche, Jalisco is strongly linked to the development of the serape, although it was widespread throughout the area then known as Nueva Vizcaya.

Guatemalan serape
The serape is not a typical garment for the Maya highland people, who wear different clothing in cold regions. The Guatemalan serape is an imitation of the Mexican serape with a Maya twist, and their production is intended for sales to foreigners or city dwellers who feel attracted to the garment. These serapes are sold through a broker, with the Mayan families, who depend mostly upon agricultural work, manufacturing small quantities for extra income. The brokers display the serapes at an incremental price at local markets or the sides of highland roads in improvised huts. The brokers are typically Maya. The appeal of the serape may be that they are made by Maya women on their traditional home looms, giving the serape a handmade look.

Modern Day
The serape has seen a resurgence in popularity over the last decade. Many trendy boutiques have added them to their inventory as companies produce new modern designs but with traditional methods. With the resurgence, people are familiarizing themselves with the handwoven methods and embracing quality over fast fashion.

See also
Huipil
Poncho
Rebozo
Textiles of Mexico
Tilmàtli
Serape effect

References
Notes

Bibliography

External links

Robes and cloaks
Mexican clothing